Frans Geurtsen (17 March 1942 – 12 December 2015) was a Dutch footballer, who played at both professional and international levels as a striker.

Club career
Geurtsen started his professional career at hometown side Velox, winning promotion to the Eerste Divisie in 1962. He played for an Utrecht XI in the 1962–63 Inter-Cities Fairs Cup, scoring twice against Tasmania Berlin. He was signed by Amsterdam club DWS in summer 1963, and was the Eredivisie top scorer in both the 1963–64 and 1964–65 seasons. He won the Eredivisie league title with DWS in 1964.

An Achilles tendon injury cut short his career and he had to retire in 1971 aged only 29.

International career
He made his debut for the Netherlands in an October 1964 FIFA World Cup qualification match against Albania, immediately scoring a goal. It proved to be his final international as well.

International goals
Scores and results list Bermuda's goal tally first.

Personal life and death
After retiring, Geurtsen worked as a technician and coached amateur sides in North Holland. He died in December 2015 in Alkmaar.

References

External links

 Voetbal International 
 2012 Interview and bio - De Oud Utrechter 

1942 births
2015 deaths
Footballers from Utrecht (city)
Association football forwards
Dutch footballers
Netherlands international footballers
AFC DWS players
Eredivisie players